Skeleton at the 2022 Winter Olympics was held at the Xiaohaituo Bobsleigh and Luge Track in Yanqing District, China. The events took place between 10 and 12 February 2022. A total of two skeleton events were held, one each for men and women.

A total of 50 quotas (25 per gender) were distributed to the sport, the same as the 2018 Winter Olympics. However, five men's quotas were transferred to the women's event to achieve gender equality. A total of 2 events were contested, one each for men and women.

Qualification

A total of 50 quota spots (25 per gender) were available to athletes to compete at the games. In July 2018, the International Olympic Committee moved five men's quotas to the women's event, to achieve gender equality.

Competition schedule
The following was the competition schedule for the two skeleton events.

All times are (UTC+8).

Medal summary

Medal table

Medalists

Participating nations
A total of 50 athletes from 21 nations (including the IOC's designation of ROC for the Russian Olympic Committee) qualified to participate. American Samoa, Brazil, Puerto Rico and the Virgin Islands made their Olympic sport debuts.

The numbers in parenthesis represents the number of participants entered.

References

External links
Official Results Book – Skeleton

Skeleton at the 2022 Winter Olympics
2022
Skeleton
Winter Olympics